Trifolium semipilosum, the Kenya clover or Kenya white clover, is a species of flowering plant in the family Fabaceae. It is native to Yemen, Eritrea, Ethiopia, Kenya, Uganda, Tanzania, Malawi and Zimbabwe, and has been introduced to Saint Helena. It is a close wild relative of the important forage crop Trifolium repens (white clover).

Subtaxa
The following varieties are accepted:
Trifolium semipilosum var. brunellii  – Ethiopia
Trifolium semipilosum var. glabrescens  – Ethiopia, Kenya, Uganda, Tanzania, Malawi and Zimbabwe
Trifolium semipilosum var. intermedium  – Ethiopia
Trifolium semipilosum var. semipilosum - Yemen, Eritrea, Ethiopia, Kenya, Uganda, Tanzania and Malawi, and introduced to Zimbabwe and Saint Helena

References

semipilosum
Flora of Yemen
Flora of Eritrea
Flora of Ethiopia
Flora of Kenya
Flora of Uganda
Flora of Tanzania
Flora of Malawi
Flora of Zimbabwe
Plants described in 1839